Major-General Andrew Gilbert Wauchope  (5 July 1846 – 11 December 1899) was a British Army officer, killed commanding a brigade at the Battle of Magersfontein in the South African War.

Life
Andrew Gilbert was the second son of Andrew Wauchope of Niddrie Marischal House, just south-east of Edinburgh in Midlothian, Scotland and Frances-Mary née Lloyd daughter of Henry Lloyd, Esq., Co. Tipperary, Ireland. Following education at Stubbington House School he was sent to HMS Britannia in 1859 to train as a naval cadet, then posted as a midshipman to St George the following year. He was not happy there, and obtained his discharge from the Navy on 3 July 1862, shortly before his eighteenth birthday.

He resolved to enter the Army, and purchased a second lieutenant's commission in the Black Watch in 1865. In 1867 he was appointed lieutenant, and served as an adjutant from 1870 to 1873. In 1873, he served in the Second Anglo-Ashanti War, detached on special service with a Hausa regiment; he was twice wounded and mentioned in despatches.

In July 1878, the United Kingdom took control of Cyprus as a result of the Cyprus Convention, and Wauchope was appointed governor of the Paphos region, returning to England in August 1880. He was promoted Captain in 1878, and made CMG in 1880.

He served on the staff in the Transvaal War in 1881, and with his regiment in the 1882 Anglo-Egyptian War. That year, he married his first wife, Elythea Ruth Erskine; she would die in childbirth in 1884, leaving him twin sons. He fought in the Mahdist War in 1884, where he was severely wounded at the Battle of El Teb on 29 February, and mentioned in despatches. He was promoted to major in March, and given a brevet lieutenant-colonelcy in May, before serving on the Nile Expedition, where he was again severely wounded at the Battle of Kirbekan in February 1885.

Following the expedition he returned to Scotland to manage his family estates at Niddrie and Yetholm, which he had recently inherited. The coal mines of Niddrie were highly productive, and as a result he became one of the richest men in Scotland. In 1893, he married his second wife, Jane Muir. She was the daughter of William Muir and she became the only woman living at Edinburgh Castle where her husband commanded the Black Watch. They had no children, and she would survive him.

A staunch Conservative, he was politically active, and opposed Gladstone for the constituency of Midlothian in the 1892 election; whilst he did not win, he reduced Gladstone's majority by over 80%. He opposed the coal strike of 1894 and the proposed eight-hour work limits for miners, but was generally recognised by his workers as a generous employer; during the coal strike he supported the families of the strikers. He again ran for Parliament at a by-election in Edinburgh South in June 1899, losing to Arthur Dewar. On the local level, he was an elder of Liberton Kirk and member of the local school board, as well as the parish council and the General Assembly of the Church of Scotland.

He was promoted to colonel in 1888, being made CB in 1889 and given command of the 2nd Battalion of the Black Watch in 1894. In 1898, he commanded a brigade in the reconquest of the Sudan, seeing action at Atbara and Omdurman, and was promoted to major-general that year as a result.

He was appointed to command the 3rd (Highland) Brigade in the South African War, which saw action at Belmont and Modder River as part of the force sent to relieve Kimberley. Pushing further, they again encountered Boer forces at Magersfontein

In the resulting Battle of Magersfontein, the Highland Brigade was ordered to make a dawn attack on the Boer defences. However, the force was spotted before it was prepared to attack, and faulty reconnaissance meant that the enemy positions were not properly located; the column came under heavy fire as it struggled to deploy for action. Wauchope was killed by rifle fire in the opening minutes of combat; the brigade was pinned down and went to ground. After Wauchope's death, the brigade was leaderless. No-one would take command until late in the afternoon – and despite the Guards Brigade being in support, in the early afternoon it was routed.

Wauchope's dying words are a subject of some dispute; Douglas' biography, quotes them as "Don't blame me for this, lads". Arthur Conan Doyle wrote that:
Rumour has placed words of reproach upon his dying lips, but his nature, both gentle and soldierly, forbids the supposition. "What a pity!" was the only utterance which a brother Highlander ascribes to him.

Memorials

After Wauchope's death, a stained glass window was given by the people of Liberton Kirk, and stands only a few feet from where he always sat in the East Gallery. To date, this is the only stained glass window in the church. Another memorial, a granite obelisk, was erected at Yetholm, near his Roxburghshire estate, in September 1902. He was also the subject of at least one poem: Wauchope! (To the memory of a gallant officer.) (1900) by Scottish Border poet and Australian bush balladeer Will H. Ogilvie (1869–1963), who had also grown up near the Yetholm area.

A substantial stained glass window was erected in St Giles Cathedral in central Edinburgh. The window is in the south-west portion of the church.

His wife, Jane, arranged for Wauchope Hall to be created in Town Yetholme which was opened in 1919. It was a conversion from a former church.

References

Sources

1846 births
1899 deaths
British Army generals
British military personnel of the Third Anglo-Ashanti War
British military personnel of the First Boer War
British Army personnel of the Anglo-Egyptian War
British Army personnel of the Mahdist War
British Army personnel of the Second Boer War
British military personnel killed in the Second Boer War
Black Watch officers
Military personnel from Edinburgh
Scottish Presbyterians
Companions of the Order of the Bath
Companions of the Order of St Michael and St George
Conservative Party (UK) parliamentary candidates
People educated at Stubbington House School